Kohlsville is an unincorporated community in the town of Wayne in Washington County, Wisconsin, United States. The Kohlsville River flows through the community and is dammed, creating the Kohlsville Millpond.

Notes

Unincorporated communities in Washington County, Wisconsin
Unincorporated communities in Wisconsin